Epilog is the second studio album from the Swedish progressive rock group Änglagård. A darker
and completely instrumental work, it was supposed to be the final
chapter of Änglagård, hence the name.

Availability
Although re-released in 2003 on the Exergy label, it was unavailable for a long time until it was re-released by the band in 2010 as a double CD.

Track listing
All songs were written by Änglagård.
"Prolog" – 2:00
"Höstsejd (Rites of Fall)" – 15:32
"Rösten (The Voice)" – 0:14
"Skogsranden (Eaves of the Forest)" – 10:48
"Sista somrar (The Last Summer)" – 13:10
"Saknadens fullhet (The Fullness of Longing)" – 2:00

Personnel
 Mattias Olsson – drums, cymbals and percussion
 Johan Högberg – Bass
 Thomas Johnson – Hammond organ, mellotron and keyboards
 Jonas Engdegård – Guitar
 Tord Lindman – Guitar
 Anna Holmgren – Flute

Guest musicians
 Åsa Eklund – Voice
 Martin Olofsson – Violin
 Karin Hansson – Viola
 Jan C. Norlander – Cello

References

1994 albums
Änglagård albums